Sphecodora is a genus of moths in the family Depressariidae. It contains only one species, Sphecodora porphyrias, which is found in Kenya.

References

Endemic moths of Kenya
Ethmiinae
Taxa named by Edward Meyrick
Monotypic moth genera
Moths of Africa